This article is about communications systems in the Federated States of Micronesia. 

In 2010, Pohnpei State was connected to the Internet using the HANTRU-1 undersea communications cable to provide high-speed bandwidth. Kosrae State,  Chuuk State, and Yap State, were planned to be connected in a second phase.

Telephone

Main lines in use:
8,000 (1995)

Mobile cellular:
NA

Telephone system:
domestic:
islands interconnected by shortwave radiotelephone (used mostly for government purposes)
international:
satellite earth stations - 4 Intelsat (Pacific Ocean)

Radio
Broadcast stations:
AM 5, FM 1, shortwave 1 (2011)

Stations below are included in the total:
AM Radio stations:
 AM 999 V6AF - (Pohnpei)
 AM 1350 V6A - Baptist Radio - Moen (Chuuk) FM.. religious-Baptist
 AM 1449 V6AH - Radio V6AH - Kolonia (Pohnpei) FM.. religious-Christian
 AM 1494 V6AI - Radio Yap - Colonia, Yap (Yap)
 AM 1503 V6AJ - Voice of Kosrae - Tofol (Kosrae) FM.. English, Kosraean
 AM 1593 V6AK - (Moen)

FM Radio stations:
 FM 88.1 V6BC (Truk)
 FM 88.1 V6AI-FM (Moen)
 FM 88.5 V6MA-FM
 FM 88.5 V6MA Bible Baptist Church Radio (Weno, Chuuk)
 FM 88.9 V6JY (Yap)
 FM 89.5 V6AK-FM Radio - Moen (Chuuk) FM English, Chuukese
 FM 89.7 V6AA (Yap)
 FM 101.1 V6AV (BBC World Service) (Yap)
 FM 104.1 V6AF-FM - Kolonia (Pohnpei) FM.. religious-Christian

There is also a shortwave relay of 88.5 FM, V6MP.

Radios:
NA

Television
Broadcast stations:
 KPON 7 Kolonia (Pohnpei, 1 kW)
 TTKK 7 Moen (Truk, 0.1 kW)
 WAAB 7 (Government station) Colonia (Yap, 1 kW) - (1997)

Several Honolulu local stations are available on cable (converted from ATSC to DVB-T): KHET (PBS), KHON-TV (Fox), KITV-TV (ABC), KHNL-TV (NBC) and KGMB-TV (CBS).

Televisions:
NA

Internet
Internet Service Providers (ISPs):
1

Country code: .fm

Notes

 
Micronesia
Micronesia